"" (When Jesus stood by the Cross) is a Lutheran Passion hymn in German by  (1472–1540), which contains seven stanzas related to seven sayings of Jesus on the cross, framed by a stanza to introduce them, and one to conclude the meditation. It appeared in 1537. The hymn tune is Zahn 1706.

The hymn was often set to music, especially for Passiontide. Heinrich Schütz used the outer stanzas to frame his dramatic setting of the same sayings of Jesus, Die sieben Worte Jesu Christi am Kreuz. Johann Sebastian Bach set the hymn as an organ chorale prelude (BWV 621) as part of the Orgelbüchlein.

References

Cited sources

External links 
 
 

16th-century hymns in German
Lutheran hymns
Passion hymns
1537 works
Music on the Passion of Jesus